She Couldn't Say No is a 1939 British comedy film directed by Graham Cutts and starring Tommy Trinder, Fred Emney and Googie Withers. It was based on a play Funny Face by Paul Gerard Smith and Fred Thompson. The screenplay features a woman who arranges a burglary to try to recover a stolen diary with compromising details written in it.

Plot summary

Cast
 Tommy Trinder as Dugsie Gibbs
 Fred Emney as Herbert
 Googie Withers as Dora
 Greta Gynt as Frankie Barnes
 David Hutcheson as Peter Thurston
 Bertha Belmore as Dr. Grimstone
 Basil Radford as Lord Pilton
 Cecil Parker as Jimmy Reeves
 David Burns as Chester
 Wylie Watson as Thrumgood
 Doris Hare as Amelia Reeves
 Geoffrey Sumner as Announcer

References

Bibliography
 Sutton, David R. A chorus of raspberries: British film comedy 1929-1939. University of Exeter Press, 2000.

External links
 
 

1939 films
1939 comedy films
Films shot at Associated British Studios
Films directed by Graham Cutts
British comedy films
British black-and-white films
1930s English-language films
1930s British films